The 1989 Nabisco Grand Prix was the only tennis circuit for male players held that year. It incorporated the four grand slam tournaments, one World Championship Tennis tournament and the Grand Prix tournaments.

Schedule 
The table below shows the 1989 Nabisco Grand Prix (to become known in 1990 as the ATP Tour).

January

February

March

April

May

June

July

August

September

October

November

December

Grand Prix rankings

List of tournament winners 
List of players and Grand Prix singles titles won, alphabetically by last name:

  Andre Agassi - Orlando (1)
  Ronald Agénor - Athens (1)
  Juan Aguilera - Bari (1)
  José Francisco Altur - San Marino (1)
  Paul Annacone - Vienna (1)
  Boris Becker - Milan, Philadelphia, Wimbledon, US Open, Paris Bercy (5)
  Jay Berger - Charleston (1)
  Paolo Canè - Båstad (1)
  Michael Chang - French Open, Wembley (2)
  Andrei Chesnokov - Nice, Munich (2)
  Jimmy Connors - Toulouse, Tel Aviv (2)
  Jim Courier - Basel (1)
  Kevin Curren - Frankfurt (1)
  Franco Davín - St. Vincent (1)
  Horacio de la Peña - Florence (1)
  Stefan Edberg - Tokyo, Season-Ending Championships (2)
  Kelly Evernden - Wellington (1)
  Marcelo Filippini - Prague (1)
  Guy Forget - Nancy (1)
  Brad Gilbert - Memphis, Stratton Mountain, Livingston, Cincinnati, San Francisco (5)
  Andrés Gómez - Boston, Barcelona (2)
  Jakob Hlasek - Rotterdam (1)
  Martín Jaite - Stuttgart, Madrid, São Paulo, Itaparica (4)
  Eric Jelen - Bristol (1)
  Kelly Jones - Singapore City (1)
  Aaron Krickstein - Sydney, Los Angeles, Tokyo Indoors (3)
  Ramesh Krishnan - Auckland (1)
  Niclas Kroon - Brisbane (1)
  Ivan Lendl - Australian Open, Scottsdale, Miami, Forest Hills, Hamburg, London, Canada, Bordeaux, Sydney Indoors, Stockholm (10)
  Alberto Mancini - Monte Carlo, Rome (2)
  Luiz Mattar - Guarujá, Rio de Janeiro (2)
  Tim Mayotte - Washington, D.C. (1)
  John McEnroe - Lyon, Dallas, Indianapolis (3)
  Miloslav Mečíř - Indian Wells (1)
  Karel Nováček - Hilversum (1)
  Guillermo Pérez Roldán - Palermo (1)
  Jim Pugh - Newport (1)
  Marc Rosset - Geneva (1)
  Emilio Sánchez - Kitzbühel (1)
  Javier Sánchez - Bologna (1)
  Carl-Uwe Steeb - Gstaad (1)
  Robert Van't Hof - Seoul (1)
  Christo van Rensburg - Johannesburg (1)
  Mark Woodforde - Adelaide (1)
  Simon Youl - Schenectady (1)

The following players won their first career title:

  Ronald Agénor
  José Francisco Altur
  Jim Courier
  Franco Davín
  Eric Jelen
  Kelly Jones
  Niclas Kroon
  Jim Pugh
  Marc Rosset
  Carl-Uwe Steeb
  Simon Youl

See also 
 1989 WTA Tour
 World Championship Tennis

References 
 ATP Archive 1989: Nabisco Grand Prix Tournaments:Accessed 22 October 2010.
 History Mens Professional Tours: Accessed 22 October 2010.

Further reading 
 

 
Grand Prix
Grand Prix tennis circuit seasons